Hexatoma is a genus of crane fly in the family Limoniidae.

Species
Subgenus Cladolipes Loew, 1865
H. cisatlantica Alexander, 1937
H. haiasana (Savchenko, 1972)
H. simplex  (Loew, 1865)
Subgenus Coreozelia Enderlein, 1936
H. cimicoides (Scopoli, 1763)
Subgenus Eriocera Macquart, 1838

H. abdominalis (Alexander, 1923)
H. absona Alexander, 1949
H. acrostacta (Wiedemann, 1821)
H. acunai (Alexander, 1928)
H. aegle Alexander, 1953
H. aequinigra Alexander, 1934
H. aetherea (Alexander, 1916)
H. aglaia Alexander, 1946
H. agni Alexander, 1963
H. aitkeni Alexander, 1966
H. albifrons (Edwards, 1928)
H. albihirta (Alexander, 1912)
H. albiprivata (Edwards, 1932)
H. albipunctata (van der Wulp, 1880)
H. albitarsis (Osten Sacken, 1869)
H. alboguttata (Matsumura, 1916)
H. albomedia (Edwards, 1932)
H. albonotata (Loew, 1852)
H. albovittata (Edwards, 1928)
H. amazonicola (Alexander, 1920)
H. ambrosia Alexander, 1938
H. anamalaiana Alexander, 1949
H. andicola (Alexander, 1923)
H. angustipennis (Enderlein, 1912)
H. angustissima (Alexander, 1927)
H. antennata (Alexander, 1930)
H. aperta (Alexander, 1920)
H. apoensis Alexander, 1961
H. arcuaria Alexander, 1974
H. arcuata Alexander, 1951
H. argentina (Alexander, 1919)
H. argyrocephala Alexander, 1937
H. arrogans (Alexander, 1927)
H. artifex Alexander, 1961
H. assamensis (Edwards, 1921)
H. aterrima (Walker, 1856)
H. aterrima (Brunetti, 1912)
H. atra (Doleschall, 1859)
H. atricornis Alexander, 1934
H. atripes Alexander, 1934
H. atrisoma Alexander, 1937
H. atroantica Alexander, 1957
H. atrodorsalis (Alexander, 1927)
H. atromarginata (Edwards, 1926)
H. atrosignata Alexander, 1942
H. aurantia (Brunetti, 1918)
H. aurantionota Alexander, 1939
H. aurata (Doane, 1900)
H. austera (Doane, 1900)
H. australiensis (Alexander, 1920)
H. azrael Alexander, 1943
H. azurea Alexander, 1938
H. badia (Brunetti, 1911)
H. basilaris (Wiedemann, 1821)
H. batesi (Alexander, 1921)
H. bazini (Edwards, 1926)
H. beameri Alexander, 1956
H. beebeana Alexander, 1950
H. bengalensis Alexander, 1933
H. bequaertiana Alexander, 1938
H. bevisi Alexander, 1956
H. bifascipennis (Edwards, 1932)
H. bifenestrata Alexander, 1938
H. biflava (Edwards, 1928)
H. biflavocincta Alexander, 1971
H. bifurcata Alexander, 1947
H. biguttipennis (Edwards, 1932)
H. bituberculata (Macquart, 1838)
H. boettcheri (Edwards, 1926)
H. borneana (Edwards, 1921)
H. brachycera (Osten Sacken, 1877)
H. braconides (Enderlein, 1912)
H. brevifurca Alexander, 1956
H. brevioricornis Alexander, 1941
H. brevipila (Alexander, 1918)
H. breviuscula (Alexander, 1929)
H. bruneri (Alexander, 1928)
H. brunettii (Edwards, 1921)
H. brunneipes (Williston, 1900)
H. cabralensis Alexander, 1945
H. caesarea (Alexander, 1931)
H. caesia Savchenko, 1979
H. californica (Osten Sacken, 1877)
H. caliginosa (Brunetti, 1918)
H. caminaria (Wiedemann, 1828)
H. candidipes (Alexander, 1923)
H. canescens Alexander, 1949
H. caninota Alexander, 1937
H. cantonensis Alexander, 1938
H. capensis (Alexander, 1921)
H. captiosa Alexander, 1946
H. carbonipes (Alexander, 1929)
H. carinivertex Alexander, 1949
H. carrerai Alexander, 1942
H. celebesiana Alexander, 1944
H. celestia Alexander, 1938
H. celestissima Alexander, 1949
H. cerberus Alexander, 1953
H. ceroxantha Alexander, 1971
H. chalybeicincta (Alexander, 1922)
H. chalybeiventris Alexander, 1949
H. chaseni (Edwards, 1932)
H. chirothecata (Scopoli, 1763)
H. chrysomela (Edwards, 1921)
H. chrysoptera (Walker, 1856)
H. chrysopteroides (Alexander, 1922)
H. cincta (Brunetti, 1918)
H. cinerea (Alexander, 1912)
H. cinereicauda (Edwards, 1926)
H. cinereithorax (Alexander, 1925)
H. cingulata (de Meijere, 1911)
H. citrina Alexander, 1965
H. cleopatra Alexander, 1933
H. coheri Alexander, 1957
H. columbiana (Alexander, 1919)
H. combinata (Walker, 1856)
H. commoda Alexander, 1937
H. commutabilis (Alexander, 1923)
H. conjuncta (Alexander, 1914)
H. constricta Alexander, 1934
H. coomani Alexander, 1941
H. cornigera (Alexander, 1914)
H. coroicoensis Alexander, 1962
H. cramptoni (Alexander, 1928)
H. crassipes (Bezzi, 1916)
H. crystalloptera (Osten Sacken, 1888)
H. ctenophoroides (Edwards, 1911)
H. cubensis (Alexander, 1926)
H. cybele (Alexander, 1927)
H. davidi (Alexander, 1923)
H. dayana Alexander, 1959
H. decorata (Brunetti, 1918)
H. denotata (Edwards, 1926)
H. dharma Alexander, 1955
H. diana (Macquart, 1834)
H. dichroa (Walker, 1856)
H. diengensis (Alexander, 1931)
H. dignitosa (Alexander, 1932)
H. dileuca (Edwards, 1928)
H. diploneura Alexander, 1934
H. disjuncta Alexander, 1938
H. disparilis (Edwards, 1932)
H. domingensis (Alexander, 1916)
H. dorothea Alexander, 1956
H. ducalis (Edwards, 1932)
H. dysantes Alexander, 1951
H. elevata Alexander, 1945
H. elongatissima (Brunetti, 1912)
H. enavata Alexander, 1938
H. eos Alexander, 1949
H. eriophora (Williston, 1893)
H. erythraea (Osten Sacken, 1886)
H. esmeralda Alexander, 1952
H. euryxantha Alexander, 1971
H. evanescens (Alexander, 1921)
H. exquisita (Alexander, 1914)
H. farriana Alexander, 1964
H. fasciata (Guerin-Meneville, 1831)
H. fenestrata (Brunetti, 1911)
H. ferax Alexander, 1937
H. ferruginosa (van der Wulp, 1885)
H. flammeinota (Alexander, 1930)
H. flammeipennis Alexander, 1942
H. flaviceps (Wiedemann, 1828)
H. flavicosta (Edwards, 1921)
H. flavida (Williston, 1900)
H. flavidibasis (Alexander, 1929)
H. flavimarginata (Yang, 1999)
H. flavipes (Brunetti, 1912)
H. flavitarsis (Edwards, 1928)
H. flavocincta (Alexander, 1920)
H. flavohirta Alexander, 1937
H. fracida Alexander, 1949
H. fuliginosa (Osten Sacken, 1860)
H. fultonensis (Alexander, 1912)
H. fulvibasis (Alexander, 1923)
H. fulvithorax Alexander, 1967
H. fulvoapicalis Alexander, 1957
H. fulvomedia Alexander, 1956
H. fumidipennis (Alexander, 1927)
H. furtiva Alexander, 1961
H. fusca (Edwards, 1911)
H. fuscinervis (Edwards, 1912)
H. gamma (Enderlein, 1912)
H. gaspensis (Alexander, 1931)
H. geminata (Alexander, 1923)
H. gibbosa (Doane, 1900)
H. gifuensis Alexander, 1933
H. glabricornis Alexander, 1969
H. glabrivittata (Alexander, 1929)
H. globiceps (Alexander, 1920)
H. glomerosa Alexander, 1960
H. gnava Alexander, 1961
H. gomesiana Alexander, 1945
H. goyazensis Alexander, 1940
H. gracilis (Osten Sacken, 1886)
H. grahami (Alexander, 1927)
H. gravelyi (Brunetti, 1918)
H. greenii (Brunetti, 1911)
H. gressittiana Alexander, 1943
H. grisea (Riedel, 1914)
H. griseicollis (Edwards, 1926)
H. haemorrhoa (Osten Sacken, 1886)
H. halteralis (Edwards, 1932)
H. hargreavesi Alexander, 1937
H. helophila (Alexander, 1921)
H. hemicera (Alexander, 1933)
H. hendersoni (Edwards, 1928)
H. hilpa (Walker, 1848)
H. hilpoides (Alexander, 1923)
H. hirtithorax Alexander, 1936
H. hoffmanni Alexander, 1938
H. homochroa Alexander, 1963
H. humberti (Osten Sacken, 1888)
H. humilis (Alexander, 1921)
H. imperator Alexander, 1953
H. indecora Alexander, 1937
H. indra Alexander, 1955
H. infixa (Walker, 1856)
H. insidiosa Alexander, 1938
H. interlineata Alexander, 1934
H. intermedia (Alexander, 1927)
H. interstitialis Alexander, 1937
H. intrita Alexander, 1943
H. iriomotensis Alexander, 1935
H. ishigakiensis Alexander, 1935
H. issikii (Alexander, 1928)
H. jacobsoni (Alexander, 1927)
H. javensis (Doleschall, 1857)
H. jocularis Alexander, 1948
H. jozana (Alexander, 1924)
H. juliana Alexander, 1937
H. jurata Alexander, 1936
H. juxta Alexander, 1938
H. kaieturensis (Alexander, 1914)
H. kala Alexander, 1962
H. kamiyai (Alexander, 1932)
H. kariyai Alexander, 1933
H. karma Alexander, 1962
H. karnyi (Edwards, 1925)
H. kelloggi (Alexander, 1932)
H. kempi (Brunetti, 1918)
H. kiangsuana Alexander, 1938
H. klapperichiana Alexander, 1957
H. klossi (Edwards, 1919)
H. kolthoffi Alexander, 1937
H. laddeyi Alexander, 1942
H. laetipes Alexander, 1955
H. lamonganensis (Alexander, 1931)
H. lanigera Alexander, 1933
H. larutensis (Edwards, 1932)
H. laticostata Alexander, 1937
H. latigrisea Alexander, 1971
H. latissima (Alexander, 1922)
H. lativentris (Bezzi, 1916)
H. leonensis (Alexander, 1920)
H. lessepsi (Osten Sacken, 1886)
H. leucotela (Walker, 1856)
H. licens Alexander, 1942
H. longeantennata (Lackschewitz, 1964)
H. longicornis (Walker, 1848)
H. longifurca (Alexander, 1920)
H. longipennis (Alexander, 1923)
H. longiradius Alexander, 1938
H. longisector Alexander, 1961
H. longistyla (Alexander, 1913)
H. lopesi Alexander, 1942
H. lunata (Westwood, 1881)
H. lunigera (Walker, 1856)
H. luteicolor Alexander, 1968
H. luteicostalis Alexander, 1933
H. luteitarsis Alexander, 1964
H. luxuriosa Alexander, 1936
H. lygropis (Alexander, 1920)
H. macquarti (Enderlein, 1912)
H. macrocera (Alexander, 1914)
H. madagascariensis Alexander, 1933
H. maesta (Edwards, 1926)
H. magistra Alexander, 1942
H. magnifica (Alexander, 1914)
H. malangensis Alexander, 1934
H. maldonadoi Alexander, 1953
H. malevolens Alexander, 1937
H. manabiana Alexander, 1942
H. mansueta (Osten Sacken, 1882)
H. margaritae Alexander, 1954
H. mariposa Alexander, 1943
H. masakii Alexander, 1934
H. mediofila Alexander, 1933
H. melanacra (Wiedemann, 1828)
H. melanolitha (Alexander, 1927)
H. melanonota Alexander, 1968
H. meleagris (Osten Sacken, 1888)
H. melina (Alexander, 1922)
H. mesopyrrha (Wiedemann, 1828)
H. mesoxantha (Osten Sacken, 1886)
H. metallica (Schiner, 1868)
H. mikirensis Alexander, 1963
H. mindanaoensis (Alexander, 1922)
H. minensis Alexander, 1934
H. miranda Alexander, 1938
H. mitra Alexander, 1962
H. monoleuca Alexander, 1938
H. monroviae (Alexander, 1930)
H. moriokana (Matsumura, 1916)
H. morosa (Osten Sacken, 1881)
H. morula (Alexander, 1923)
H. muiri (Alexander, 1923)
H. multicolor Alexander, 1937
H. multiguttula Alexander, 1939
H. murudensis (Edwards, 1926)
H. mutica (Edwards, 1928)
H. myrtea (Alexander, 1922)
H. neognava Alexander, 1971
H. neopaenulata Alexander, 1957
H. neosaga Alexander, 1947
H. nepalensis (Westwood, 1836)
H. nigerrima (Brunetti, 1912)
H. nigricans (Edwards, 1927)
H. nigrina (Riedel, 1913)
H. nigripennis (van der Wulp, 1904)
H. nigroantica Alexander, 1957
H. nigrochalybea (Alexander, 1922)
H. nigrocoxata Alexander, 1957
H. nigronotata (Alexander, 1931)
H. nigrotrochanterata (Alexander, 1932)
H. nimbipennis Alexander, 1938
H. nipponensis (Alexander, 1918)
H. nitidiventris (Edwards, 1926)
H. nitidula (Edwards, 1928)
H. novella Alexander, 1937
H. nudivena Alexander, 1933
H. nyasicola (Alexander, 1920)
H. obliqua (Alexander, 1923)
H. obscuripennis (Edwards, 1912)
H. obsoleta (Williston, 1900)
H. ocellifera (Alexander, 1915)
H. ochripleuris (Edwards, 1927)
H. ogloblini Alexander, 1935
H. ohausiana (Enderlein, 1912)
H. omanensis Hancock, 1997
H. omeiana Alexander, 1933
H. optabilis (Walker, 1856)
H. opulenta Alexander, 1951
H. orbiculata (Edwards, 1926)
H. ornata (Enderlein, 1912)
H. ornaticornis Alexander, 1939
H. pachyrrhina (Osten Sacken, 1888)
H. pachyrrhinoides (Edwards, 1927)
H. pacifica Alexander, 1956
H. paenulata (Enderlein, 1912)
H. paenulatoides Alexander, 1949
H. pallidipes (Alexander, 1926)
H. palomarensis Alexander, 1947
H. pannosa (Enderlein, 1912)
H. paragnava Alexander, 1973
H. patens Alexander, 1938
H. pendleburyi (Edwards, 1928)
H. pennata Alexander, 1962
H. perdecora (Alexander, 1914)
H. perelongata Alexander, 1969
H. perenensis (Alexander, 1923)
H. perennis (Osten Sacken, 1882)
H. perexigua Alexander, 1942
H. perfestiva Alexander, 1951
H. perhirsuta Alexander, 1973
H. perlaeta (Alexander, 1922)
H. perlongata Alexander, 1961
H. perlunata Alexander, 1938
H. pernigrina Alexander, 1938
H. perornata Alexander, 1938
H. perpulchra (Alexander, 1914)
H. perrara Alexander, 1936
H. peruviana (Alexander, 1914)
H. perversa Alexander, 1937
H. pervia Alexander, 1966
H. phaeton Alexander, 1961
H. piatrix Alexander, 1942
H. pieli Alexander, 1937
H. pieliana Alexander, 1940
H. platysoma (Alexander, 1930)
H. plaumanni Alexander, 1937
H. plecioides (Walker, 1856)
H. pleskei Alexander, 1933
H. plumbeicolor Alexander, 1942
H. plumbeinota Alexander, 1940
H. plumbicincta (Brunetti, 1911)
H. plumbolutea (Edwards, 1921)
H. plutonis Alexander, 1937
H. politovertex Alexander, 1950
H. posticata Alexander, 1937
H. praelata (Alexander, 1923)
H. preposita Alexander, 1956
H. pretiosa (Osten Sacken, 1886)
H. prolixa Alexander, 1961
H. propinquua Alexander, 1936
H. pterotricha Alexander, 1940
H. pulchripes (Alexander, 1922)
H. pulchrithorax (Brunetti, 1918)
H. pullatipes Alexander, 1951
H. punctigera (Edwards, 1928)
H. purpurata Alexander, 1949
H. pusilla (Alexander, 1920)
H. pusilloides Alexander, 1955
H. pyrrhochroma (Walker, 1856)
H. pyrrhomesa (Edwards, 1919)
H. pyrrhopyga Alexander, 1933
H. quadriatrata Alexander, 1937
H. quadriaurantia Alexander, 1950
H. rama Alexander, 1955
H. regina Alexander, 1937
H. retrograda Alexander, 1953
H. reverentia Alexander, 1949
H. robinsoni (Edwards, 1921)
H. roraimella Alexander, 1935
H. rossiana Alexander, 1961
H. rubrescens (Walker, 1856)
H. rubriceps (Edwards, 1916)
H. rubrinota (Alexander, 1918)
H. rudra Alexander, 1963
H. ruficauda (Edwards, 1931)
H. ruficornis (Macquart, 1838)
H. rufipennis (Alexander, 1925)
H. rufiventris (Brunetti, 1918)
H. rufoantica Alexander, 1965
H. rupununi Alexander, 1945
H. sachalinensis (Alexander, 1924)
H. saga Alexander, 1940
H. salakensis (Edwards, 1925)
H. sanctaemartae (Alexander, 1919)
H. saturata (Alexander, 1919)
H. sauteriana (Enderlein, 1912)
H. scalator Alexander, 1938
H. schauseana Alexander, 1967
H. schildeana Alexander, 1967
H. schineri (Alexander, 1922)
H. schnusei (Kuntze, 1913)
H. sculleni Alexander, 1943
H. sculleniana Alexander, 1965
H. scutellata (Edwards, 1911)
H. seimundi (Edwards, 1928)
H. selene (Osten Sacken, 1881)
H. semilimpida (Brunetti, 1911)
H. semilunata Alexander, 1937
H. semirufa (Alexander, 1927)
H. serena Alexander, 1961
H. serendib Alexander, 1958
H. setifera (Alexander, 1931)
H. setigera Alexander, 1962
H. setivena Alexander, 1975
H. setosivena Alexander, 1978
H. shawanoensis Alexander, 1959
H. shirakii (Edwards, 1921)
H. simalurensis (de Meijere, 1916)
H. sincera Alexander, 1942
H. sinensis (Edwards, 1921)
H. solor Alexander, 1943
H. spatulata (Alexander, 1925)
H. speciosa (Alexander, 1914)
H. spinosa (Osten Sacken, 1860)
H. stackelbergi Alexander, 1933
H. stolida Alexander, 1934
H. stricklandi (Edwards, 1921)
H. subaurantia Alexander, 1937
H. subcandidipes Alexander, 1979
H. suberecta Alexander, 1949
H. subgracilis Alexander, 1939
H. sublima (Alexander, 1914)
H. sublunigera Alexander, 1937
H. submorosa (Alexander, 1923)
H. subnitens (Edwards, 1927)
H. subocellata Alexander, 1964
H. subpaenulata (Edwards, 1926)
H. subpusilla Alexander, 1933
H. subrectangularis (Alexander, 1924)
H. subsaga Alexander, 1942
H. substolida Alexander, 1939
H. sumatrensis (Macquart, 1850)
H. superba Savchenko, 1976
H. susainathani Alexander, 1949
H. sycophanta Alexander, 1937
H. tacita Alexander, 1951
H. taenioptera (Wiedemann, 1828)
H. tahanensis (Edwards, 1928)
H. tenebrosa (Walker, 1856)
H. tenuis (Brunetti, 1912)
H. terebrella Alexander, 1960
H. terebrina Alexander, 1960
H. terryi (Alexander, 1923)
H. testacea (Brunetti, 1912)
H. thaiensis Alexander, 1953
H. thaiicola Alexander, 1957
H. tholopa (Alexander, 1931)
H. tibetana Alexander, 1933
H. timorensis Alexander, 1936
H. tinkhami Alexander, 1938
H. toi Alexander, 1938
H. tonkinensis Alexander, 1941
H. townsendi (Alexander, 1914)
H. toxopei Alexander, 1937
H. tranquilla (Alexander, 1922)
H. trialbosignata Alexander, 1942
H. triangularis (Brunetti, 1912)
H. trichoneura Alexander, 1956
H. tricolor (Edwards, 1932)
H. trifasciata (von Roder, 1885)
H. triflava Alexander, 1963
H. trimaculata (Edwards, 1921)
H. tripunctipennis (Brunetti, 1918)
H. tristis (Alexander, 1914)
H. tuberculata Alexander, 1936
H. tuberculifera (Edwards, 1911)
H. tumidiscapa (Alexander, 1920)
H. umbripennis (Edwards, 1921)
H. unicolor (de Meijere, 1914)
H. uniflava Alexander, 1969
H. unimaculata (Edwards, 1931)
H. urania Alexander, 1949
H. ussuriensis Alexander, 1934
H. vamana Alexander, 1961
H. variegata Alexander, 1936
H. velveta (Doane, 1900)
H. venavitta Alexander, 1940
H. verticalis (Wiedemann, 1828)
H. vidua Alexander, 1937
H. villosa (Edwards, 1932)
H. virgulativentris (Enderlein, 1912)
H. viridivittata Alexander, 1938
H. vittinervis Alexander, 1936
H. vittipennis (Alexander, 1922)
H. vittula (Alexander, 1932)
H. vulcan Alexander, 1960
H. vulpes Alexander, 1961
H. walayarensis Alexander, 1951
H. weberi Alexander, 1951
H. wiedemanni Alexander, 1933
H. williamsoni (Alexander, 1923)
H. willistoni (Alexander, 1913)
H. wilsonii (Osten Sacken, 1869)
H. xanthopoda Alexander, 1971
H. xanthopyga (de Meijere, 1914)
H. yerburyi (Edwards, 1921)
H. zonata (Osten Sacken, 1886)

Subgenus Euhexatoma Alexander, 1936
H. triphragma Alexander, 1936
Subgenus Hexatoma Latreille, 1809
H. baluchistanica Alexander, 1957
H. bicolor (Meigen, 1818)
H. brevistigma Alexander, 1953
H. fuscipennis (Curtis, 1836)
H. gaedii (Meigen, 1830)
H. hartmani Hynes, 1986
H. japonica Alexander, 1922
H. khasiensis Alexander, 1962
H. kiangsiana Alexander, 1937
H. kinnara Alexander, 1963
H. madrasensis Alexander, 1961
H. mediocornis Alexander, 1943
H. megacera (Osten Sacken, 1860)
H. microcera Alexander, 1926
H. microstoma Edwards, 1928
H. nigra Latreille, 1809
H. nubeculosa (Burmeister, 1829)
H. obscura (Meigen, 1818)
H. perproducta Alexander, 1958
H. prolixicornis Alexander, 1943
H. schmidiana Alexander, 1957
H. seticornis Alexander, 1949
H. vittata (Meigen, 1830)
Subgenus Parahexatoma Alexander, 1951
H. angustatra Alexander, 1963
H. aurantivertex Alexander, 1963
H. beieri Alexander, 1970
H. decurvata Alexander, 1937
H. ferruginea (Edwards, 1912)
H. lambertoni Alexander, 1951
H. luteipennis (Edwards, 1912)
H. memnon Alexander, 1965
H. nigrivertex Alexander, 1958
H. pauliani Alexander, 1951
H. rubrivertex Alexander, 1955
H. teresiae Alexander, 1960

References

Limoniidae
Nematocera genera